Shahrak-e Kalateh-ye Sheikh Ali (also Romanized as Shahraḵ-e Kalāteh-ye Sheykh ʿAlī) is a village in Qaen Rural District, in the Central District of Qaen County, South Khorasan Province, Iran. At the 2006 census, its population was 165, in 44 families.

References 

Populated places in Qaen County